István Dóczi (born 8 January 1965) is a Hungarian water polo player. He competed in the men's tournament at the 1992 Summer Olympics.

See also
 List of World Aquatics Championships medalists in water polo

References

External links
 

1965 births
Living people
Hungarian male water polo players
Olympic water polo players of Hungary
Water polo players at the 1992 Summer Olympics
Water polo players from Budapest